Roy Talsma  (born 31 August 1994) is a Dutch footballer who plays as a forward for GVVV.

Club career
Talsma was born in Velp. After playing for Eendracht Arnhem, De Graafschap and ESA Rijkerswoerd, he joined Vitesse Arnhem's youth setup in 2007, aged 13, being released in 2014.

On 26 June 2014 Talsma joined SC Telstar, in Eerste Divisie. He made his professional debut on 15 August, coming on as a late substitute in a 1–2 home loss against Roda JC.

On 17 April 2015 Talsma agreed a deal with GVVV, being effective in June.

References

External links
Telstar official profile 

1994 births
Living people
Dutch footballers
Association football forwards
Eerste Divisie players
Derde Divisie players
SC Telstar players
Netherlands youth international footballers
People from Rheden
Footballers from Gelderland